Midnight Man is a fictional character appearing in American comic books published by Marvel Comics.

Anton Mogart appeared in the Marvel Cinematic Universe series Moon Knight (2022), portrayed by Gaspard Ulliel.

Publication history
Midnight Man first appeared in Moon Knight #3 (January 1981), and was created by Doug Moench and Bill Sienkiewicz.

The character subsequently appears in Moon Knight #9–10 (July–August 1981).

Fictional character biography

Early life 
Nothing is known about Anton Mogart's past before he started stealing great works of art, jewels and such from locations all around the world, the thefts taking place promptly at midnight, which earned him the name Midnight Man. He lived in an opulent New Jersey mansion and stole these things simply to own them, not for the money.

Moon Knight 
On the 22ed day of a theft spree in New York City, Mogart stole a rare Monet oil painting from the Ramadan Art Gallery. He was later stopped by Moon Knight and fell into the river and was presumed drowned. In actuality he was carried by the current to New York and the mouth of a drainage viaduct. There the wastes in the sewer melted his face leaving him deformed. Hiding in the sewers for three days he returned to his home to find the police had taken all his stolen goods. Blaming Moon Knight for this and his deformity, he vowed vengeance. Driven insane he lived in the sewers and started collecting trash instead of treasure. He worked with Raoul Bushman who lured Moon Knight into a flooding sewage chamber with Midnight Man in it. Moon Knight was able to chisel an escape route in the brick and Midnight Man was once again washed down a river.

Death 
Later learning that he was dying from cancer, Mogart tracked down his illegitimate son Jeff Wilde. Mogart then taught Wilde his trade secrets, but begged him not to become a criminal. Mogart then challenged Moon Knight for one last time and apparently died as a result. After he died Wilde took the alias Midnight and tried to become the sidekick of Moon Knight, but instead ended up as a villain. Later after a battle with the Secret Empire, Jeff Wilde was transformed into a cyborg by the Secret Empire's scientists. He went out on a killing spree to get Moon Knight's attention. Moon Knight beat Midnight Man in a brutal fight.

Powers and abilities
 Master Thief: Anton was an accomplished art thief, escaping from authorities across the globe. 
 Martial Artist: He was able to hold his own against Moon Knight in a fight.

Weapons
Midnight Man uses a handgun and a dagger, the latter of which is a part of his stolen art collection.

In other media
Anton Mogart appears in the Marvel Cinematic Universe television series Moon Knight episode "The Friendly Type", portrayed by Gaspard Ulliel, who died before the series was released, with the episode being dedicated in his memory. This version is an antiquities collector and an acquaintance of Layla El-Faouly's.

References

Characters created by Bill Sienkiewicz
Characters created by Doug Moench
Comics characters introduced in 1981
Fictional professional thieves
Marvel Comics martial artists
Marvel Comics supervillains